Longchuan County is a county located in Dehong Prefecture, Yunnan province, southwestern China.

Administration
The county seat is in Zhangfeng Town.

Three other townships have been upgraded to town (镇, zhen) status: 
Longba (陇把), Chengzi (城子), Jinghan (景罕)

At present, Longchuan County has 4 towns, 7 townships and 1 ethnic township. 
4 towns

4 townships

1 ethnic township
 Husa Achang

Culture
Many citizens of Dehong Prefecture belong to the Jingpo-nation ethnic group, an official minority in the People's Republic of China. They are one and the same as the people of Kachin State, the adjacent part of Myanmar, and ethno-linguistic ties are strong.

Climate

References

External links
Longchuan County Official Website

 
County-level divisions of Dehong Prefecture